Kentsfield is the code name of the first Intel desktop Core 2 Quad and quad-core Xeon CPUs, released on November 2, 2006. The top-of-the-line Kentsfields were Core 2 Extreme models numbered QX6x00, while the mainstream Core 2 Quad models were numbered Q6x00. All of them featured two 4 MiB L2 caches. The mainstream 65 nanometer Core 2 Quad Q6600, clocked at 2.4 GHz, was launched on January 8, 2007 at US$851 (reduced to US$530 on April 7, 2007). July 22, 2007 marked the release of the Core 2 Quad Q6700 and Core 2 Extreme QX6850 Kentsfields at US$530 and US$999 respectively; the price of the Q6600 was later reduced to US$266. Both Kentsfield and Kentsfield XE use product code 80562.

Variants

Kentsfield
Analogous to the Pentium D branded CPUs, the Kentsfields comprise two separate silicon dies (each equivalent to a single Core 2 Duo) on one MCM. This results in lower costs, but a lesser share of the bandwidth from each of the CPUs to the northbridge than if the dies were each to sit in separate sockets as is the case for the AMD Quad FX platform. As might be predicted from the two-die MCM configuration, the thermal design power of the Kentsfield (QX6800 - 130 watts,

QX6700 - 130 W,

Q6600 - 105 W
) is double that of its similarly clocked Core 2 Duo counterpart.

The multiple cores of the Kentsfield mostly benefits applications that can easily be broken into a small number of parallel threads (such as audio and video transcoding, data compression, video editing, 3D rendering and ray-tracing). To take a specific example, multi-threaded games such as Crysis and Gears of War which must perform multiple simultaneous tasks such as AI, audio and physics benefit from quad-core CPUs. In such cases, the processing performance may increase relative to that of a single-CPU system by a factor approaching the number of CPUs. This should, however, be considered an upper limit as it assumes that the user-level software is properly threaded. To return to the above example, some tests have demonstrated that Crysis fails to take advantage of more than two cores at any given time. On the other hand, the impact of this issue on broader system performance can be significantly reduced on systems which frequently handle numerous unrelated simultaneous tasks such as multi-user environments or desktops which execute background processes while the user is active. There is still, however, some overhead involved in coordinating execution of multiple processes or threads and scheduling them on multiple CPUs which scales with the number of threads/CPUs. Finally, on the hardware level there exists the possibility of bottlenecks arising from the sharing of memory and/or I/O bandwidth between processors.

Kentsfield XE
The first Kentsfield XE processor, the Core 2 Extreme QX6700 (product code 80562) with a clock speed of 2.67 GHz, was released on November 2, 2006 at US$999. It was discontinued on January 4, 2008. It featured the Kentsfield XE core and complemented the Core 2 Extreme X6800 dual-core processor based on the Conroe XE core. Similarly to the previous dual-core Extreme processors, CPUs with the Kentsfield XE core had unlocked multipliers.

The Core 2 Extreme QX6800 clocked at 2.93 GHz was released on April 8, 2007, at US$1,199. It had a 130 W TDP thermal envelope, and was intended for high end OEM-only systems.

The Core 2 Extreme QX6850 clocked at 3.0 GHz was launched on July 22, 2007, at US$999.  It featured a faster 1333 MT/s FSB. Simultaneously, the previously available Core 2 Extreme QX6700 had its price reduced.

Related processors 
The dual-core desktop version of Kentsfield is Conroe. The server versions of Kentsfield are the dual-processor Clovertown (Xeon 53xx) and the multi-processor Tigerton (Xeon 73xx).

Successor 
Kentsfield was replaced by the 45 nm Yorkfield processor.

References 

Intel microprocessors